The Motorola Q9c is a Windows Mobile 6 smartphone, a slim device with a similar style to Motorola's MOTORAZR.

Sprint first offered the Motorola Q9c in November 2007. It is the second generation Motorola Q, with updated features and software. Measuring ½” thicker than the last one, the Motorola Q9c offers the Windows Mobile smartphone Home screen, with direct links to business applications such as email, calendar, contacts, to-dos and more. It can be customized using XML to contain other information, including links to voicemail, SMS, weather (via the free Weather Bug plugin). The Motorola Q9c has Windows Mobile 6, stereo Bluetooth, EV-DO Rev. A broadband-speed downloads, voice dialing and a full HTML Web browser to surf the internet.

Verizon released the Q9m in late 2007, which has music features specific to Verizon, as well as the Q9c for their network in June 2008 with a black metal bezel.  Alltel and U.S. Cellular released the Q9c in the late summer of 2008, offering the same model in lime-green. AT&T currently uses the Q9h model (which is the GSM version of the same phone).

In June 2008, Motorola added a software update allowing Sprint customers to officially upgrade their operating system to Windows Mobile 6.1.

Key features

MOTO Q 9c is a smart phone made in 2008 that delivers high-speed mobile Web at EV-DO speeds with Microsoft Internet Explorer and USB 1.1 connectivity. Configuration of consumer email accounts (POP3/ IMAP4) and Windows Mobile with Direct Push technology keeps users connected to both work and personal email accounts, in real time. MOTO Q 9c has 128 MB of internal memory and is upgradable up to 32GB of optional removable memory, and has Microsoft ActiveSync that allows users to sync email, contacts and calendars with their PC.

Specifications
 Calculator - Yes
 Calendar - MS Pocket Outlook
 Mini-USB Port - Yes, Includes Charging & Data Cable
 Type-C Port - No
 Vibrate - Yes
 Phonebook Capacity - Uses Shared Memory
 Multiple Numbers Per Name - NO

Messaging features
 HTML Web Browsing - Yes, Opera Browser 8.6 Supports HTML, SSL, JavaScript, Cookies, Bookmarks, Frames and VPNs
 Multimedia Messaging - Yes
 Text Messaging (SMS) - Yes
 Instant Messenger Built-in - Yes
 Email Client - Yes, Pocket Outlook With Attachment Viewing, ActiveSync Over-the-air or USB, POP3/SMTP Support
 Predicting Words and Phrases - Yes

Personalization and fun features
 Polyphonic Ringtones - Yes, 64 Chords, Downloadable
 Custom Ringtones - Yes
 Pre-loaded Ringtones - Yes
 MP3 Ringtones - Yes
 Ringer Profiles - Yes, Plus AAC Real Music Tones Supported
 Picture Caller ID - NO
 Multiple Languages - Yes
 Games - Yes, Downloadable
 Customizable Graphics - Yes

Technical specifications
 Application Platform - Java
 Platform / Operating System - Windows Mobile 6; Windows Mobile 6.1 (Using Motorola's update tool)
 Data Download Speed - EV-DO Rev.O (Up to 1.2 Mbit/s Burst Download Speed) Where Available, 1xRTT (Up to 130 kbit/s) Nationally
 Network Compatibility - CDMA 800, 1900
 Ringtone Types Supported - iMelody, MIDI, MP3, AAC, WAV, WMA, WAX, QCELP
 Built-In Memory - 128MB storage, 64MB RAM
 Expandable Memory Capacity - Yes, miniSD Card Formats Supported, Up to 32GB Card Size
 Dimensions - 4.6 in × 2.55 in × 0.46 in
 Weight - 4.58 oz
 Compatible Carrier - Sprint, Verizon, Alltel, U.S. Cellular
 WiFi 802.11 Compatible - With WiFi SDIO Card (Sold Separately)

Box contents
 Additional Items Included - Battery, User Guide, USB Charger Cable, Wall Charger, Bluetooth Earpiece, ActiveSync Software

See also
 Motorola Q
 Windows Mobile
 Smartphone
 ActiveSync
 Windows Mobile Device Center

References

External links
 Technical Specifications
 Specifications at Phonescoop.com

Windows Mobile Standard devices
Q 9c